David McNally may refer to:

 David McNally (director) (born 1960), English film director
 David McNally (football), former chief executive of Norwich City F.C.
 David McNally (academic) (born 1953), Canadian political scientist
 Dave McNally (1942–2002), American baseball player